Tape from California is Phil Ochs' fifth album, released in mid-1968 on A&M Records. It continues Ochs' musical shift away from straight-ahead protest songwriting toward more orchestral and baroque arrangements.

Track listing
All songs by Phil Ochs.

Side One
"Tape From California" – 6:45
"White Boots Marching in a Yellow Land" – 3:35
"Half A Century High" – 2:53
"Joe Hill"  – 7:18
"The War Is Over" – 4:25

Side Two
"The Harder They Fall" – 3:52
"When In Rome" – 13:13
"Floods of Florence" – 4:52

Personnel
Phil Ochs - guitar, vocals
Larry Marks - producer
Joe Osborn - bass guitar on "Tape From California"
Lincoln Mayorga - piano, keyboards
Van Dyke Parks - piano, keyboards on "Tape From California"
Ramblin' Jack Elliott - flat-picked guitar on "Joe Hill"
Ian Freebairn-Smith - arrangements

References

External links

1968 albums
Phil Ochs albums
A&M Records albums